Basil Pizza & Wine Bar is a restaurant in the Crown Heights neighborhood of Brooklyn, New York.

Basil is credited with "ushering in the new era of fine kosher dining in the neighborhood, " so that by 2017 The Jewish Week described Crown Heights as "an eating destination."  The menu features a range of vegetarian and fish dishes, in addition to pizza baked in a wood-fired oven.

Frank Bruni of the New York Times describes Basil, which opened in 2010 on the West Indian side of a neighborhood with a mixed population of Orthodox Jews, immigrants from the West Indies, that was beginning to attract hipsters and upscale purchasers for it fin de siecle row houses, as a "cross-cultural experiment, trying to promote better integration of, and communication between, groups in Crown Heights that haven’t always mingled much or seen eye to eye."  

Moshe Wendel was part of the team that opened Basil.  The Forward called Wendel, one of the "small band of chefs has led the way in kosher dining, with restaurants that rival their local non-kosher competition." 

The owner is Daniel Branover.

References

Crown Heights, Brooklyn
Fleischig restaurants
Jewish American cuisine
Jews and Judaism in Brooklyn
Restaurants established in 2009
Restaurants in Brooklyn